Sergey Vladimirovich Kovalenko (born May 25, 1976, in Shakhty, Rostov Oblast) is an amateur Russian Greco-Roman wrestler, who played for the men's welterweight category. He won a bronze medal for the 66 kg division at the 2006 World Wrestling Championships in Guangzhou, China. He is also a two-time medalist at the European Championships (2005 in Varna, Bulgaria and 2006 in Moscow, Russia), and a member of SKA Saint Petersburg in Saint Petersburg, under his personal coach Grigori Davidyan.

At age thirty-two, Kovalenko made his official debut for the 2008 Summer Olympics in Beijing, where he competed in the men's 66 kg class. He defeated Algeria's Mohamed Serir by a technical superiority (a score of 0–12) in the preliminary round of sixteen, before losing out the quarterfinal match to Bulgarian wrestler and 2005 World champion Nikolay Gergov, with a three-set technical score (1–2, 5–2, 1–3), and a classification point score of 1–3.

References

External links
Profile – International Wrestling Database
NBC 2008 Olympics profile

Russian male sport wrestlers
1976 births
Living people
Olympic wrestlers of Russia
Wrestlers at the 2008 Summer Olympics
People from Shakhty
Lesgaft National State University of Physical Education, Sport and Health alumni
Saint Petersburg University of Economics and Finance alumni
World Wrestling Championships medalists
Sportspeople from Rostov Oblast